The Nagtglas's African dormouse (Graphiurus nagtglasii) is a species of rodent in the family Gliridae. It is found in Cameroon, Central African Republic, Ghana, Liberia, Nigeria, Sierra Leone, and possibly Gabon. Its natural habitat is subtropical or tropical, moist, lowland forests. The rodent is named after Cornelis Nagtglas.

References
 Grubb, P. & Schlitter, D. 2004.  Graphiurus nagtglasii.   2006 IUCN Red List of Threatened Species.   Downloaded on 29 July 2007.
Holden, M. E.. 2005. Family Gliridae. pp. 819–841 in Mammal Species of the World a Taxonomic and Geographic Reference. D. E. Wilson and D. M. Reeder eds. Johns Hopkins University Press, Baltimore.

Graphiurus
Mammals described in 1888
Taxonomy articles created by Polbot